Kingston railway station is located on the Beenleigh line in Queensland, Australia. It serves the Logan suburb of Kingston.  Located directly next to the station is the Kingston Butter Factory community arts centre.

History
The station was the central point of a town that initially developed about the stop.

Services
Kingston station is served by all stops Beenleigh line services from Beenleigh to Bowen Hills and Ferny Grove.

Services by platform

References

External links

Kingston station Queensland's Railways on the Internet
[ Kingston station] TransLink travel information

Kingston, Queensland
Railway stations in Logan City